The 1930–31 Scottish Districts season is a record of all the rugby union matches for Scotland's district teams.

History

Glasgow District beat Edinburgh District in the Inter-City match.

Results

Inter-City

Glasgow District: H. F. Gormley (West of Scotland), R. Murdoch (Hillhead HSFP), W. G. Stewart (Glasgow HSFP), Max Simmers (Glasgow Academicals), James Forrest (Glasgow Academicals), Ian Shaw (Glasgow HSFP), Jimmy Nelson (Glasgow Academicals), G. C. Langlands (Glasgow HSFP), W. A. Macpherson (Glasgow HSFP), G. C. Scott (Glasgow Academicals), J. Stewart (Glasgow HSFP), L. M. Stuart (Glasgow HSFP), J. M. Dykes (Kelvinside Academicals), G. W. Cres (Glasgow Academicals), R. Rowand (Glasgow HSFP)

Edinburgh District: J. L. Tod (Edinburgh Academicals), G. R. Gunn (Royal HSFP), William Emslie (Royal HSFP), G. P. R. Macpherson (Edinburgh Academicals), D. P. Henshaw (Watsonians), B. R. Tod (Edinburgh Academicals), W. R. Logan (Edinburgh University), J. R. Thom (Watsonians), R. Allan (Watsonians), R. J. Henderson (Edinburgh Academicals), A. R. Lamb (Institution), M. S. Stewart (Stewart's College), W. C. C. Agnew (Stewart's College), A. Porter (Royal HSFP), W. Wood (Leith Academicals)

Other Scottish matches

North of Scotland District: J. M. M'Leod (Aberdeen Grammar School F.P.'s); A. W. Mac Donald (Moray). R. S. Bateman (Moray) A. B. Donald (Aberdeen University), and D. W. Brown (Aberdeen University); G. W. Bowes (A.G.F.P.s) and C. M. Murray Aberdeen University); R. Bain (A.G.F.P.s) W. A. Barclay (Gordonians), J. A. Freeland (Gordonians), J. B. Gill (Aberdeen University), D. Middleton (Aberdeen University), J. A. Morrice (A.G.F.P.s), G. Stroud (Aberdeenshire), and J. Trail (A.G.F.P-s). 

Midlands District: A. H. M. Hutton (Dunfermline), J. McMichen (St Andrews), N. Lindsay (Waid Academy F.P.), A. W. Wilson (captain), and C. H, Brown (Dunfermline); M. Lind (Dunfermline) J. Carmichael (St Andrews); J. Bald (Dunfermline), J. S. Fraser (Dunfermline), J. McFadzen (Dundee H.S.F.P.), J. R. Ness (Dunfermline), G. Oglivie (Panmure), George Ritchie (Dundee H.S.F.P.), J. S. Wilson (St Andrew's), and J. W. A. Wright (Panmure).

North of Scotland District: 

South of Scotland District: 

Provinces District:  

Anglo-Scots:

Trial matches

Probables:  

Possibles:

English matches

No other District matches played.

International matches

No touring matches this season.

References

1930–31 in Scottish rugby union
Scottish Districts seasons